is a Japanese television drama series premiered on NTV on 10 January 2015. This drama has nothing to do with the Japanese horror film of the same name. The first episode was extended by 15 minutes. It received the viewership rating of 9.2% on average. In this drama, Suzu Hirose played the lead role for the first time.

Plot
An ordinary high school girl starts a revolution in her school with a talented speechwriter's assistance.

Cast
Main characters
 Suzu Hirose as Tsubame Haruna, a high school girl
 Ryūnosuke Kamiki as Kei Shizukui, a speechwriter
Platinum 8
 Anna Ishibashi as Minami Aso
 Hana Sugisaki as Mimori Koda
 Shotaro Mamiya as Natsuki Sudo
 Jin Shirasu as Takuto Hinata
 Aoi Yoshikura as Emiri Hazuki
 Marie Iitoyo as Rena Ibuki
 Ryo Narita as Riku Okura
 Kentaro Ito as Haru Senzaki
Others
 Shigeru Izumiya as Tokujirō, Tsubame's grandfather
 Atsuko Asano as Mitsuko Honda, chief director of the school
 Katsuhisa Namase as Hirao Kintoki, a vice principal
 Maho Nonami as Sumire Hibiki, a school counselor

Episodes

References

External links
  
 
 

Japanese drama television series
2015 Japanese television series debuts
2015 Japanese television series endings
Nippon TV dramas